St. Kabir Public School is a co-educational, private school located in Sector 26, Chandigarh.

History
St. Kabir Public School was established in 1974 in Sector 8 Chandigarh, [[India]In 1991, it shifted to its current facility in Sector 26 Chandigarh. It has been consistently ranked as one of the schools in the Tri-City area (Chandigarh, Mohali and Panchkula) for the years 2013, 2014, and 2015.

Founder
Mr J. P. Singh was the founder. Some quotes from him are:
 On discipline: Though imbibing self discipline is the ultimate aim, we ask disciplinary committees to maintain discipline in the campus. Since in today's world outside influence on students is more important than the older days, a little bit of imposition from the school authority is required to make the student realize the importance of it in their life.
 On tuition menace: There is no harm in students taking extra bit of coaching for a short while but it should not be of longer duration as tuition does not only make them dependent but is also a time killer, leaving the children with very little time to pursue other activities

Achievements
The school participates in inter-school competitions, and organizes inter-house competitions. In 2012, two students from the school attended the Summer Studies Program organized by the Duke University, the TIP program in the Infosys Mysore Campus. The children take part in national and international Olympiads.

Campus facilities
The school campus has gardens that are well laid out and maintained. The school is active in TERI activities and every year an ambassador is chosen from the school.

References

 Kabir Roll of Old Students KROS
 Tribune, Chandigarh Tribune
 School Website : www.stkabir.co.in
 school Instagram :https://www.instagram.com/izballuofficial/

Private schools in Chandigarh
Educational institutions established in 1974
Christian schools in Chandigarh
1974 establishments in Chandigarh